The Open or The Open Championship is one of the four major championships in professional golf.

The Open may also refer to:
 The Open (band), an English indie rock band
 The Open Group, an open software consortium

See also
 Open (disambiguation)
 U.S. Open, various US-hosted sport championships